The North West of Ireland Open was a golf tournament which was played annually from 1999 to 2002. It was a "double-badge" tournament that featured on the schedules of both the European Tour and the Challenge Tour. In 2002 it was played at the Ballyliffin Golf Club in County Donegal, Ireland with a prize fund of €358,517.

Tournament hosts
2002: Ballyliffin Golf Club
2000–01: Slieve Russell Hotel Golf & Country Club
1999: Galway Bay Golf & Country Club

Winners

Notes

External links
Coverage on the European Tour's official site

Former European Tour events
Former Challenge Tour events
Golf tournaments in the Republic of Ireland
Golf in Connacht
Sports competitions in Connacht
Sport in County Donegal
1999 establishments in Ireland
2002 disestablishments in Ireland
Recurring sporting events established in 1999
Recurring sporting events disestablished in 2002